Spindle turning, or turning between centers, is a woodturning method referring to a piece of wood on a wood lathe that is being turned on its center axis.

Method
For spindle turning, the wood is held on the lathe either by both ends (between the headstock and tailstock) or by one end only using a lathe chuck 

Wood is generally removed by running a turning tool down the slope of the wood from a larger diameter in the wood to a smaller diameter.

Examples
Spindle turning is the method used for items such as chair and table legs, lamps, cues, bats, pens, candlesticks etc. i.e. long and thin objects.

See also 
 Turned chairs, chairs made with their frame components turned into bobbins

References 

Woodturning